Ramasgar  is a village in the southern state of Telangana, India.It is one of the largest crop producer in Telangana

See also
 Bellary
 Districts of Karnataka

References

External links
 http://Bellary.nic.in/

Villages in Bellary district